9B, 9b or IX-B may refer to :
 Route 9B (WMATA), a bus route operated by the Washington Metropolitan Area Transit Authority
 Stalag IX-B, a World War II German Army prisoner of war camp at Wegscheide close to Bad Orb
 9B (TV series), a 1988 TV series with Canadian actor Zachary Ansley
 Boron-9 (9B), an isotope of boron
 HAT-P-9b, an extrasolar planet

See also
 List of highways numbered 9B
B9 (disambiguation)